Ingrid Ragnvaldsdotter (Old Norse: Ingiríðr Rögnvaldsdóttir) (1100/1110 – after 1161 AD) was born a member of the Swedish royal family, became a member of Danish royalty by marriage and later was Queen consort of Norway as the spouse of Harald IV of Norway. Married four times, Ingrid had a number of children who played prominent roles in Swedish and Norwegian history.

Biography
Ingrid Ragnvaldsdotter was born between 1100 and 1110. History has not recorded either the name nor background of Ingrid's mother. She was the daughter of Ragnvald Ingesson, the only known son and heir of King Inge I of Sweden. However, Ragnvald died early and never succeeded as king.

Ingrid first married  Henry Skadelaar (Henrik Svendsen Skadelår), son of Svend Svendsen of Denmark, who was one of the bastard sons of King Sweyn II of Denmark. Svend Svendsen was an unsuccessful pursuer to the throne, who died when he was at a point of being elected as king. Henry Skadelaar was crippled and not considered a candidate for kingship. Instead he was a frequent schemer and plotter, generating a number of enemies. Three sons of Henry and Ingrid are recorded, including King Magnus II of Sweden. Ingrid is known to have intrigued for Magnus to obtain the Swedish throne, in Ingrid's opinion her late father's rightful inheritance. She reportedly suggested that her son Magnus employ the man who would kill Sverker I of Sweden. Henry Skadelaar died on 4 June 1134 at the Battle of Fotevik in the Bay of Fotevik near Vellinge in Skåne. 
 
Ingrid soon after married King Harald Gille of Norway. By him, Ingrid had a son who later became King Inge Haraldsson of Norway. When King Harald was murdered in 1136, Ingrid played a prominent part in having her son, Inge, and her stepson, Sigurd, proclaimed co-rulers, and in waging the ensuing war against the attempted usurper, Sigurd Slembe. She remained one of the most important advisors of King Inge throughout his reign.

Her third husband was Ottar Birting (Óttarr Birtingr), a prominent lendmann, but she was again widowed when he was killed in Nidaros at some point in the 1140s.

Between her third and fourth husband, Ingrid bore a child out of wedlock, Orm Ivarsson,  by an otherwise unknown man called Ivar Sneis.

Ingrid's fourth and last husband was Arne Ivarsson of Stårheim, (Árni Ívarsson á Stoðreimi), another prominent lendmann with whom she had four children. Arne Ivarsson was subsequently called Kongsmåg meaning in-law of the king.

As an advisor to her son King Inge, Ingrid played a prominent part in many of the events of the early civil war era in Norway. On 3 February 1161, King Inge was defeated and killed, leading his men into battle against King Haakon the Broadshouldered. In the saga Heimskringla, Ingrid is last mentioned when she and her husband left Norway for exile in Denmark.

Notes on name
Ingrid's name can be found in a wide variety of spellings in the modern Scandinavian languages and English. Her first name, in Old Norse Ingiríðr, is rendered as Ingrid or Ingerid. Her patronym, in Old Norse Rögnvaldsdóttir, can be rendered as Ragnvaldsdotter, Ragvaldsdotter or Ragnvaldsdatter.

Issue

by Henry Sweynson (Henrik Skadelår)
 King Magnus II of Sweden (Magnus Henriksson) - who arranged the murder of Saint Eric IX of Sweden, and possibly also Sverker I of Sweden; was himself murdered; and was regarded a usurper afterwards
 Jarl Ragnvald Henriksson  (Ragvald  Henriksson) - Riksjarl of Sweden during his brother's brief reign
 Burits Henriksson (also Buris/Boris; likely 1130–1167, murdered), Earl of Jutland, in 1166 married with a daughter (b. 1150) of Luitgard of Stade and Hermann II, Count of Winzenburg.

by Harald Gille (Haraldr Gilli)
 King Inge Haraldsson of Norway (Ingi Haraldsson)

by Ivar Sneis (Ívarr Sneis)
 Orm  Ivarsson (Ormr konungsbróðir) (illegitimate) - prominent leader during the reign of king Magnus Erlingsson, and after the death of Erling Skakke, next to the king in power.

by Arne Ivarsson of Stårheim (Árni Ívarsson á Stoðreimi)
 Philip of Herdla (Philippus í Herðlu)
 Bishop Nicholas Arnesson (Nikolás Árnason) - co-founder of the Bagler party
 Inge Arnesson (Ingi Árnason)
 Margrete Arnesdotter (Margrét Árnadóttir), who became mother of the Bagler king Philip Simonsson

References

Sources
Lagerqvist, Lars O Sverige och dess regenter under 1000 år (Stockholm: Albert Bonniers Förlag AB. 1982)

	

12th-century births
12th-century deaths
Ingrid 1110
Norwegian royal consorts
Norwegian civil wars
Norwegian exiles
House of Stenkil
House of Estridsen
Fairhair dynasty
12th-century Swedish people
12th-century Norwegian people
12th-century Norwegian women
12th-century Swedish women
Remarried royal consorts
Queen mothers